Neville Mallett (born 9 September 1938) is a South African cricketer. He played in 32 first-class matches for Eastern Province between 1956/57 and 1969/70.

See also
 List of Eastern Province representative cricketers

References

External links
 

1938 births
Living people
South African cricketers
Eastern Province cricketers